Odd Crew is a Bulgarian metal band from Sofia, formed in 1998. The band consists of vocalist Vasko Raykov, guitarist Vasil Parvanovski, bassist Martin Stoyanov and drummer Boyan "Bonzy" Georgiev. The band has released six studio albums and two live DVDs. Their latest album, Dark Matters Part I, was released in May 2022.

History

Formation 
In Sofia in 1989, two 3-year-olds riding bicycles in their neighborhood accidentally bumped into each other. Both named Vasil, they became friends and together discovered bands such as Black Sabbath and Led Zeppelin. Their shared passion for music and sound inspired them and soon Vasil Parvanovski started playing the guitar and Vasko Raykov began singing and playing the piano.

In 1995, the 8-year-old Parvanovski’s classmate, Martin Stoyanov, joined them. His initial desire was to be the drummer of the band, but this idea quickly vanished as he received a bass guitar as a present from his neighbor. So Martin became and remained the bassist of the band to present day.

In 1998, the parents of Vasil Parvanovski took him to visit a family friend, one of the most famous blues performers in Bulgaria, Vasko ‘Krupkata’ (the ‘Patch’). 12-year-old Parvanovski heard hard drumming coming from the basement of the house they were visiting, and that turned out to be the young son of ‘Krupkata’, the then 8-year-old Boyan ‘Bonzy’ Georgiev. Parvanovski was immediately impressed by Bonzy and proposed him to jam with the band.

And it's Rock Again (1998–2000)
1 August 1998 is the date of the first rehearsal for the four band members which remain unchanged as of today. The band was originally called Kaskadiori ("Stuntmen"). They chose the name because they had a car accident on the way to the studio. One year after their formation the band recorded its first album - And It's Rock Again, released in the spring of 2000.

On the Road and River of Time (2001–2006)
In 2001 Kaskadiori joined the blues band of Vasko "The Patch" and toured with him in the next several years. During this period they continued writing songs and in 2005 they released the album On the Road. In 2006 they released another album called The River of Time.

Odd Crew and We Are What We Are (2007–2008)
As the members of the band grew up they started writing heavier songs which quite differed from the past melody rock material. They gradually adopted music as a lifestyle and started using it as way to express themselves and talk to society. At that time the members of the band decided to substitute their present name (Kaskadiori) with another one which better reflected their new ideas about making music. On 1 August 2008, the band had a concert to celebrate their birthday and announced their new name - Odd Crew. Later that year Odd Crew released the album We Are What We Are. Suddenly the band attracted a lot of fans who shared their ideas and vision about united society having music as lifestyle.

European tour and A Bottle of Friends (2009–2011)
In 2009 Odd Crew had already played on every club stage in Bulgaria and went on the 11 Years of Brotherhood tour in various countries around Europe, including Hungary, Germany, Switzerland and England. During the time the band was not on the road they reconstructed their rehearsal room into a recording studio in order to experiment and improve their sound. Soon Butcher House studio was built and they recorded their latest album, A Bottle of Friends, released on 22 October 2010. Odd Crew released their first DVD on 29 December.

Beyond the Shell (2012)
In 2012 Odd Crew signed a deal with KMK Records and on 9 June released the album Beyond the Shell. It contains 15 tracks, including "Death Trap" (their most famous song so far) and three instrumentals.

Mark These Words (2015)

On 27 December 2014 the band started a crowd-funding campaign on IndieGogo and announced that they were preparing to record their upcoming album Mark These Words. The plan was to record the album with the American producer Jason Suecof at his studio in Florida, U.S. When they reached 20% of the money for the campaign they released a demo track from the album called "Lay On Me", and three weeks later an acoustic version of the song. Shortly after that, though, the American embassy declined to give them visas for the project in the United States. The band decided to record the album with Swedish producer Daniel Bergstrand in Dugout Studios (Uppsala, Sweden) and then send the tracks to Jason Suecof for mixing and mastering. The campaign was set to end on 18 February and shortly after that the band started the recording process. Through the campaign they sold over 300 copies of the album in advance. In 2017 Odd Crew finally released the long-awaited live DVD - Mark These Words - live at Christo Botev Hall.

The Lost Pages (2018)
On 14 February 2018 the first video was released for the band's new album - "Same old me", directed from Supers4upen Motion Madness.
On 19 March 2018 The Lost Pages album was officially released. It can be bought from Bandcamp, iTunes and Amazon, or played on Spotify. The album shows much more lyrical and acoustic sound than the previous studio albums. A Bulgarian tour was started to support the album.

Band members

Current
Vasko Raykov – lead vocals (1998–present)
Vasil Parvanovski – guitars and vocals (1998–present)
Martin Stoyanov – bass and backing vocals (1998–present)
Boyan "Bonzy" Georgiev – drums (1998–present)

Discography
Studio albums

Kaskadiori
And it's Rock Again (2000)
On the Road (2005)
The River of Time (2006)

Odd Crew
We Are What We Are (2008)
A Bottle of Friends (2010)
Beyond The Shell (2012)
Mark These Words (2015)
The Lost Pages (2018)
Dark Matters (Part 1) (2022)

DVDs
A Bottle of Friends
Live at Hristo Botev Hall

References

External links

 Official website
 Odd Crew at Bulgarian Rock Archives

Bulgarian heavy metal musical groups